The 1954 United States Senate special election in California was held on November 2, 1954, to elect a U.S. Senator to complete the unexpired term of Senator Richard Nixon, who resigned on becoming Vice President of the United States following the 1952 presidential election. Incumbent Republican U.S. Senator Thomas Kuchel, who had been appointed by Governor Earl Warren, won election to the remainder of the term, defeating Democratic nominee Sam Yorty.

Primary elections 
Primary elections were held on June 8, 1954.

Democratic primary

Candidates
Isobel M. Cerney, teacher and writer (cross-filing)
Adam C. Derkum, accountant, unsuccessful candidate for Democratic nomination for U.S. Senate in 1946
Leo Gallagher, lawyer
Thomas Kuchel, incumbent U.S. Senator (cross-filing)
Sam Yorty, incumbent U.S. Representative

Results

Republican primary

Candidates
Isobel M. Cerney, teacher and writer (cross-filing)
William T. Hooley, fireman
Thomas Kuchel, incumbent U.S. Senator
Sam Yorty, incumbent U.S. Representative (cross-filing)

Results

Independent–Progressive primary

Candidates
Isobel M. Cerney, teacher and writer

Results

General election

Results

See also 
 1954 United States Senate elections

References

Bibliography
 
 
 
 

California 1954
California 1954
1954 Special
California Special
United States Senate Special
United States Senate 1954